This is a list of divers, who competed on the international level:

A 
Inga Afonina 
Rafael Álvarez 
Joakim Andersson 
Robert Andersson 
Jennifer Abel

B 
Jorge Betancourt 
Hobie Billingsley 
Myriam Boileau 
Noemi Batki 
Elena Bertocchi

C 
Franco Cagnotto 
Tania Cagnotto 
César Castro 
Jennifer Chandler 
Chen Ruolin 
Philippe Comtois 
Iohana Cruz 
Cao Yuan

D 
Thomas Daley 
Yasemin Dalkılıç 
Alexandre Despatie 
Klaus Dibiasi 
Alexander Dobroskok 
Scott Donie 
Troy Dumais 
Cassius Duran

E 
Janet Ely 
Paola Espinosa 
Dick Eve

F 
Heike Fischer 
Erick Fornaris 
Fu Mingxia

G 
Gao Min 
Rebecca Gilmore 
Daniel Goodfellow 
José Guerra 
Guo Jingjing

H 
Blythe Hartley 
Mathew Helm 
Émilie Heymans 
Hu Jia

I 
Vera Ilyina

J 
Jia Tong 
Edwin Jongejans 
Daphne Jongejans

K 
Bruce Kimball 
Dick Kimball 
Albin Killat 
Micki King 
Ditte Kotzian 
Ulrika Knape 
Beatrice Kyle

L 
Irina Lashko
Mark Lenzi 
Lao Lishi 
Anna Lindberg 
Li Na 
Li Ting 
Davide Lorenzini 
Greg Louganis 
Wendy Lucero 
Igor Lukashin

M 
Pat McCormick 
Heiko Meyer 
Yelena Miroshina 
Anne Montminy 
Bobby Morgan

N 
Yeoh Ken Nee 
Chantelle Newbery 
Robert Newbery 
Bryan Nickson 
Axel Norling

O 
Yevgeniya Olshevskaya 
Yolanda Ortíz

P 
Rommel Pacheco 
Yuliya Pakhalina 
Hugo Parisi 
Annie Pelletier 
Peng Bo 
Fernando Platas 
Dean Pullar

Q 
Qin Kai 
Qiu Bo

R 
Aileen Riggin 
Axel Runström

S 
Sang Xue 
Sun Shuwei 
Dmitri Sautin 
Tobias Schellenberg 
Conny Schmalfuss 
Nora Subschinski 
Jacqueline Schneider 
Andrey Semenyuk

T 
Leon Taylor 
Tian Liang 
Vladimir Timoshinin 
Svetlana Timoshinina 
Hjördis Töpel 
Loudy Tourky 
Tan Liangde

U

V 
Juliana Veloso

W 
Peter Waterfield 
Bob Webster 
Andreas Wels 
Ute Wetzig 
Laura Wilkinson 
Melissa Wu 
Wu Minxia

X 
Xiao Hailiang 
Xiong Ni

Y 
Yang Jinghui

Z 
Zhou Jihong 
Zhang Yanquan 

Divers

Divers